Raman Bedi (BDS (Bristol), MSc (Manchester), DDS and DSc (Bristol), FDSRCS (Edinburgh and England), FGDP, FPHM) is Professor of Transcultural Oral Health at King's College London and was the Chief Dental Officer of England from 2002 to 2005. He is Chairman of the Global Child Dental Fund, having established the Global Child Dental Health Taskforce, and continues to practise.

Chief Dental Health Officer
Professor Bedi served as the Chief Dental Officer of England from 1 October 2002 to 1 October 2005. Notable developments towards which Bedi contributed in this period include the passage of the Health and Social Care Act (dental clauses) 2004, Water Act (Fluoridation) 2004 and the Section 60 (2005) order reforming the General Dental Council.

Bedi also chaired the English Dental Workforce Review (2004) and completed its implementation targets in October 2005 (namely increasing the primary care workforce by 5% net and generating a 25% increase in dental undergraduate training). Other focuses of Bedi's term included reform of the prison dental service and of the Salaried Dental Service.

In September 2005 he chaired the UK European Union Presidency dental programme.

Academic career
Professor Bedi held the Foundational Chair in Transcultural Oral Health at the Eastman Dental Institute, University College London, and was Director of the National Centre for Transcultural Oral Health from 1996–2002. From 1998–2008 he was the co-director of the World Health Organization Collaborating Centre at the Eastman Dental Institute.

Professor Bedi is currently Professor of Transcultural Oral Health at King's College London and holds an honorary chair at University College London. He also has an honorary "Extraordinary Professorship" in Paediatric Dentistry at the University of the Western Cape, South Africa (2007–2010), and chairs at I.T.S. Centre for Dental Studies & Research, India and Maulana Azad Institute of Dental Sciences, New Delhi.

He was President of the British Society for Disability and Oral Health (2002), President of the Education Research Group of the International Association for Dental Research (IADR) (2002–2004) and chair of the IADR Regional Development Programme Committee (2002–2004).

Bedi's research is focused on the management and prevention of early childhood caries. He has published extensively, with an output of over 180 scientific papers and serves on several editorial boards and as a referee for a number of academic journals. His teaching activities include lecturing and examining in the UK and internationally, as well as supervising graduate students.

Clinical Activities
Professor Bedi is an active clinician focusing exclusively on the full mouth rehabilitation of young children. He was an NHS consultant in paediatric dentistry from 1991–2005 and is on the General Dental Council specialist list in paediatric dentistry and dental public health. He is a WHO consultant in curriculum development in the area of patient safety and dentistry and co-chair of the Global Expert Committee on dental caries management and prevention.

Global Child Dental Health Taskforce
Professor Bedi is Director of the Global Child Dental Health Taskforce. The taskforce supports governments in their efforts to improve children's oral health. As of 2010, the Taskforce was working in 13 countries. Professor Bedi is also Chairman of the Global Child Dental Fund, a charity established to further the work of the Taskforce.

Voluntary work and other positions
Professor Bedi was an elected member of the General Synod of the Church of England from 1995 to 2005 and chaired the Archbishop's Council (Church of England) Urban and Community Affairs Committee (1996–2001). He was a founding Board member of the Higher Education Leadership Foundation, a member of the HE National Mentoring Scheme for senior staff (2003–07) and a member of the HEFCE Strategic committee for Wider Participation (2003–09). He has also served as Chairman of the British association of Physicians of Indian Origin (2006–09 and as a Trustee of the Children's Society (2006–2009). He is presently the pro bono Clinical Director of the charity Dentaid. He is also the chair of the Oral health working group of the World Federation of Public Health Associations.

Awards
In 2003 Bedi received the Asian Guild award and, in 2004, the Asian Jewel award. In 2005 he was awarded the USA Public Health service medal.

Selected publications
Begh RA, Aveyard P, Upton P, Bhopal RS, White M, Amos A, Prescott RJ, Bedi R, Barton P, Fletcher M, Gill P, Zaidi Q, Sheikh A. Promoting smoking cessation in Bangladeshi and Pakistani male adults: design of a pilot cluster randomised controlled trial of trained community smoking cessation workers. Trials. 2009 Aug 14;10:71.

Bedi R, Scully C. Tobacco control—debate on harm reduction enters new phase as India implements public smoking ban. Lancet Oncol. 2008 Dec;9(12):1122-3.

McNeill A, Bedi R, Islam S, Alkhatib MN, West R. Levels of toxins in oral tobacco products in the UK. Tob Control. 2006 Feb; 15(1):64-7.

Conway DI, Quarrell I, McCall DR, Gilmour H, Bedi R, Macpherson LM. Dental caries in 5-year-old children attending multi-ethnic schools in Greater Glasgow—the impact of ethnic background and levels of deprivation. Community Dent Health. 2007 Sep;24(3):161-5.

Ready D, Lancaster H, Qureshi F, Bedi R, Mullany P, Wilson M. Effect of amoxicillin use on oral microbiota in young children. Antimicrob Agents Chemother. 2004 Aug; 48(8):2883-7.

McGrath C, Bedi R. J ; Measuring the impact of oral health on quality of life in Britain using OHQoL-UK (W).Public Health Dent. 2003 Spring; 63(2):73–7.

External links
 Global Child Dental Fund
 Global Child Dental Health Taskforce

References

 

Chief Dental Officers for England
English dentists
Academics of King's College London
Living people
Year of birth missing (living people)